China and weapons of mass destruction may refer to:

People's Republic of China and weapons of mass destruction (mainland China)
Republic of China and weapons of mass destruction (Taiwan)

See also
Political status of Taiwan